Operation Acid Gambit was a  Delta Force operation that retrieved Kurt Muse, an American spy living in Panama who had been arrested for plotting the overthrow of the government of Panama, from the Cárcel Modelo, a notorious prison in Panama City.

Background
Muse had been arrested  in 1989 for setting up covert anti-Noriega radio transmissions in Panama. The raid, conducted by 23 Delta Force operators and supported by the Night Stalkers, was delayed until the United States invaded Panama to arrest Noriega, in Operation Just Cause on 20 December 1989. Muse was later reported to be a CIA operative by The Washington Post.

The last contact Muse had with an American official before the raid was intense and unnerving. The meeting between Muse and an unidentified American Colonel was in the public visiting area with other prisoners as well as numerous Panamanian guards. During the visit an American helicopter buzzed at a low altitude and high speed above the prison. When the sound subsided the Colonel addressed Muse loud enough for the entire room to hear. He stated that there was an order to kill Muse if the United States were to become involved in a conflict with Panama, which essentially meant Muse was not a prisoner but a hostage. The Colonel then stood up and said in a loud and deliberate tone that if anyone harmed him, not one person would walk out of that prison alive. With this the room fell entirely silent as the Colonel turned and walked out. He stated this with the knowledge that a rescue mission was about to be executed.

The operation
Leading the operation was Lieutenant Colonel Eldon Bargewell and Major Gary L. Harrell. The Delta operators were inserted onto the roof of the prison by MH-6 Little Bird helicopters. One operator was tasked to abseil down to the side of the building, hang outside Muse's cell window, and eliminate the guard charged with killing Muse if a rescue was mounted.  However, the guard was not there.  

After breaching the rooftop door with breaching charges, the Delta operators raced down the two flights of stairs towards Muse's cell. A Delta operator killed the guard who was responsible for killing Muse in case of a rescue.  Muse's lock on his cell door was shot twice; however, the lock did not break, and a small explosive was used to gain access to his cell.
Delta operators gave Muse body-armour, a ballistic helmet and goggles and moved him to the roof, where they would be exfiltrated by MH-6 Little Birds back to the US base.   

Their "Precious Cargo" (Muse) was now secure and a Delta operator called in for extraction.  During extraction from the prison, the Hughes MH-6 Little Bird helicopter transporting Muse crashed. Delta Force operators Pat Savidge, Tom Caldwell, James Sudderth, and Kelly Venden were wounded in the crash. Everyone aboard the helicopter quickly took cover in a nearby building. The Delta operators managed to signal one of the gunships flying over the area with an infrared strobe light, and shortly thereafter an armored personnel carrier from the 5th Infantry Division extracted Muse and the retrieval team.

Several years after the rescue, Muse collaborated on a book about the incident titled Six Minutes to Freedom with bestselling author John Gilstrap.

See also 
List of special forces units
List of operations conducted by Delta Force
List of Delta Force members
Raid at Renacer Prison

References

External links
 ShadowSpear: Operation Acid Gambit 
 Operation Acid Gambit - The Rescue of Kurt Muse

Conflicts in 1989
History of Panama
20th-century military history of the United States
Acid Gambit
Military raids
Prison raids
December 1989 events in North America
United States invasion of Panama